Tueeulala Falls is located on the north side of Hetch Hetchy Valley in Yosemite National Park. At roughly 880 feet it is the smaller of two large waterfalls that spill into Hetch Hetchy Reservoir, the other being Wapama Falls. It is, however, the larger of the two in terms of greatest free-fall distance, as Wapama is split into two falls. Tueeulala Fall drops free for 600 feet, hits a ledge, then slides steeply down 280 feet further. The hike to the top of the falls is off trail but fairly brush free and straightforward.

The waterfall is highly seasonal and is one of the most irregular waterfalls in the park. This is due to it being located on a channel of Falls Creek, the waterfall which Wapama Falls is on, that only flows during spring snowmelt when water from the creek overflows the bank. This can turn Tueeulala Falls into one of the most powerful waterfalls in the park during certain times, however it can also lose flow faster than any other waterfall in Yosemite.

References

External links 
Tueeulala at Waterfalls West

Waterfalls of Yosemite National Park
Landforms of Tuolumne County, California
Plunge waterfalls